Der Schlern (full German title: Der Schlern – Zeitschrift für Südtiroler Landeskunde) is a German-language monthly for the study of science, research, art and culture related to South Tyrol.

First published on 1 January 1920, it is named after the Schlern, a characteristic mountain in the Dolomites. In 1938, it was forbidden by the Italian fascist regime as part of their Italianization of South Tyrol programme, but permitted again by the allied administration in 1946.

The magazine is currently published in Bolzano by Athesia (formerly Tyrolia).

References

Further reading
 Hans Grießmair (1979). Der Schlern. Register für die Jahrgänge 1920–1978 (Verfasser-, Personen-, Orts-, Sach- und Bildregister). Bozen: Athesia.
 Hans Glaser (1989). Der Schlern 1–61 (1920–1987): Stichwortverzeichnis der Jahrgänge 1920–1987. Bozen: Athesia.
 Hannes Obermair (2013). "Umbrüche – Übergange – Chancen. Landesgeschichtliche Zeitschriften im Raum Tirol-Südtirol-Trentino und in Italien". In: Thomas Küster (ed.). Medien des begrenzten Raumes. Landes- und regionalgeschichtliche Zeitschriften im 19. und 20. Jahrhundert, Paderborn: Schöningh, pp. 265–81 (Online, 1,85 MB).

External links 
Issue 1 from 1920
Der Schlern at HathiTrust

1920 establishments in Italy
Cultural magazines
Folklore magazines
German-language magazines
German-language mass media in South Tyrol
Magazines published in Italy
Monthly magazines published in Italy
Magazines established in 1920
Mass media in Bolzano
Visual arts magazines